Go-Lo was a chain of Australian discount variety stores with hundreds of stores throughout Australia. It was part of the largest discount retailer group in Australia. It was owned by Jan Cameron's Retail Adventures along with Sam's Warehouse, Crazy Clark's and Chickenfeed stores. 

The company was sold by Miller's Retail to Australian discount retail in 2005. The chain's parent company, Australian Discount Retail, went into receivership in January 2009 after owing $201 million to creditors. Recently the company and the other three chains of stores owned by Australian Discount Retail have been bought by Jan Cameron under the company name Retail Adventures.

Retail Adventures previously announced that they will be abandoning the "Go-Lo" brand name. Over the next five years, all stores owned by Retail Adventures were to be re-branded and refitted as "Chickenfeed" based on the company's Tasmanian chain of discount stores.

However, on 27 October 2012, parent company Retail Adventures Pty Ltd went into administration. Owner Jan Cameron continued to operate the business with a licence from the administrators. The Chickenfeed rebranding ceased, and any profitable Go-Lo stores were rebranded as Crazy Clark's.

See also
Australian Discount Retail
Homeart

References

External links
Official Go-Lo Page  (now redirects to a badly-made Rehab Website)

Discount stores of Australia
Retail companies disestablished in 2012
2012 disestablishments in Australia
Defunct retail companies of Australia